Ramsay House may refer to:

Ramsay-McCormack Building, Birmingham, Alabama, listed on the National Register of Historic Places in Birmingham, Alabama
Ramsay-Durfee Estate, Los Angeles, California, listed on the NRHP in California
Ronald and Dorcas Ramsay House, Atchison, Kansas, listed on the National Register of Historic Places in Atchison County, Kansas 
Ralph Ramsay House, Richfield, Utah, formerly listed on the listed on the National Register of Historic Places in Sevier County, Utah
Ramsay (Greenwood, Virginia), listed on the NRHP in Virginia
Ramsay House (Ellensburg, Washington), listed on the National Register of Historic Places in Kittitas County, Washington

See also
Ramsey House (disambiguation)